Mohamed Alouini is a Tunisian Olympic middle-distance runner. He represented his country in the men's 1500 meters and the men's 800 meters at the 1984 Summer Olympics. His time was a 3:49.78 in the 1500, and a 1:47.20/1:45.78 in the 800 heats/semifinals.

References 

1957 births
Living people
Tunisian male middle-distance runners
Olympic athletes of Tunisia
Athletes (track and field) at the 1984 Summer Olympics
Universiade medalists for Tunisia
Universiade medalists in athletics (track and field)
Medalists at the 1983 Summer Universiade
20th-century Tunisian people